LeRoy A. Ufkes Court at Western Hall is a 5,139-seat multi-purpose arena in Macomb, Illinois. It was built in 1964. It is home to the Western Illinois University Leathernecks men's and women's basketball teams and the women's volleyball team.

History and features
Completed in 1964, its stadium-style seats, combined with bleachers in the upper levels, accommodate 5,139 fans surrounding the maple wood floor.

The playing surface in Western Hall has undergone several changes in its history. Originally a wooden floor, the regulation-size court was replaced with a tartan floor in 1973 and, prior to the 1993-94 basketball season, upgraded with a parquet floor similar to that in the old Boston Garden. In 2014, the parquet floor was replaced with a maple wood floor. The court is surrounded by a Chem-turf jogging track.

The building underwent massive construction in 1997 with the addition of the $8 million Student Recreation Center to its south. The SRC serves as host to all intramural and club sports, and houses a swimming pool, racquetball courts, suspended jogging track and state-of-the-art exercise equipment.

In the summer of 1999, the court received a face lift with a new floor design featuring Rocky, the WIU mascot, and it was refinished during the summer of 2000.
The latest addition to Western Hall, a new training facility for all WIU athletic programs and locker room for the Leatherneck football program which was added onto the East Arena, was completed in July 2000.

Events
Besides serving as the home for varsity basketball and volleyball, Western Hall houses numerous athletic and physical education activities and many major Bureau of Cultural Affairs events, including concerts, musicals and multi-cultural entertainment events for all ages. One of the highlights of the 1999-2000 BCA season was an appearance by Bill Cosby.

See also
 Western Illinois Leathernecks men's basketball
 Western Illinois Leathernecks women's basketball
 Western Illinois Leathernecks
 List of NCAA Division I basketball arenas

References

External links
Western Hall - The Official Athletics Site of the Western Illinois University Leathernecks

Basketball venues in Illinois
College basketball venues in the United States
College volleyball venues in the United States
Indoor arenas in Illinois
Volleyball venues in Illinois
Western Illinois Leathernecks men's basketball
Western Illinois Leathernecks women's basketball
Western Illinois Leathernecks sports venues
1964 establishments in Illinois
Sports venues completed in 1964